

The Blériot-SPAD S.27 was a small French airliner developed soon after World War I.  It was produced as a way for the Blériot company to find new markets for its wartime products in the postwar market, in this instance by adapting the design of the S.20 fighter into a small airliner. Accommodation for two passengers was provided in a small cabin within the fuselage, but in other respects the S.27 strongly resembled its predecessor.

Three were operated by CMA on its Paris-London route, this total increasing to ten by the time that the company merged into Air Union.

Operators

CMA/Air Union

Specifications (S.27)

See also

References

 
 
 aviafrance.com

1910s French airliners
Blériot aircraft
Single-engined tractor aircraft
Biplanes
Aircraft first flown in 1919